The Renault Viva Grand Sport  (branded as the Renault Vivastella Grand Sport before August 1935) was introduced alongside an updated version of the Nervastella in October 1934 at the Paris Motor Show.   The last cars were produced in August 1939:  in anticipation of the 1940 model year a prototype of another updated Viva Grand Sport was produced during the summer of 1939, but in the event this single car was the only one of its type to be produced.

The car was styled by Marcel Riffard who previously had been better known as an aircraft designer.

Engine 
The Viva Grand Sport was powered by a 6-cylinder straight engine with  displacement.

Celebrity promotion 
Renault concluded a contract with the high-profile pilot Hélène Boucher to promote the car.

Wins 
In 1934 Renault won the Grand Prix de la Baule.

Types

Sources and notes 

Viva Grand Sport
Cars introduced in 1934